The Bishop of Cork was a separate episcopal title which took its name after the city of Cork in Ireland. The title is now united with other bishoprics. In the Church of Ireland it is held by the Bishop of Cork, Cloyne and Ross, and in the Roman Catholic Church it is held by the Bishop of Cork and Ross.

Pre-Reformation bishops
The diocese of Cork was one of the twenty-four dioceses established at the Synod of Rathbreasail on an ancient bishopric founded by Saint Finbarr in the sixth-century.

On 30 July 1326, Pope John XXII, on the petition of King Edward II of England, issued a papal bull for the union of the bishoprics of Cork and Cloyne, the union to take effect on the death of either bishop. The union should have taken effect on the death of Philip of Slane in 1327, however, bishops were still appointed to each separate bishopric. The union eventually took place with Jordan Purcell appointed bishop of the united see of Cork and Cloyne in 1429.

Post-Reformation bishops
Following the Reformation, the united see of Cork and Cloyne continued with parallel apostolic successions. In the Church of Ireland, the title eventually became part of the current united bishopric of Cork, Cloyne and Ross.

In the Roman Catholic Church, Cork and Cloyne remained united until 10 December 1747 when Pope Benedict XIV decreed them to be separated. Cloyne became part of the united bishopric of Cloyne and Ross until 24 November 1850 when they were separated. The see of Cork remained a separate bishopric until 19 April 1958 when it united with Ross to form the current united bishopric of Cork and Ross.

See also

 Abbot of Cork

References

Lists of Anglican bishops and archbishops
Lists of Irish bishops and archbishops
Religion in County Cork
Bishops of Cork
Bishops of Cork or Cloyne or of Ross
 Bishop